Erik Thomas (born January 16, 1995) is an Argentine basketball player for Abejas de León of the Liga Nacional de Baloncesto Profesional (LNBP). He played college basketball for the University of New Orleans, where in 2017 he was named the Southland Conference Player of the Year.

Thomas was born in Paraná, Entre Ríos to an American professional basketball player and an Argentine mother. He starred at Wesley Chapel High School in Florida, where he was named the state Class A Player of the Year as a senior. He was lightly-recruited due to his small size for a power forward and a torn ligament in his ankle, so he opted for junior college, enrolling first at East Georgia State College and then at Baton Rouge Community College. He ultimately committed to New Orleans to finish his college career. Thomas started for two seasons, and in 2016–17 he averaged 19.3 points and 7.8 rebounds per game, leading the Privateers to a Southland Conference championship and earning Southland Player of the Year honors.

Thomas spent the 2019-20 season with Ferro Carril Oeste of the Liga Nacional de Básquet, averaging 13 points, 7.1 rebounds and 2.7 assists per game. On July 14, 2020, he signed with Soles de Mexicali of the Liga Nacional de Baloncesto Profesional.

Thomas is eligible to play for the Argentina national basketball team, having tried out for the Argentine U-17 team in 2010.

References

External links
New Orleans Privateers bio

1993 births
Living people
Afro-Argentine sportspeople
Argentine men's basketball players
Argentine people of African-American descent
Astros de Jalisco players
Basketball players from Florida
Ferro Carril Oeste basketball players
Junior college men's basketball players in the United States
Libertad de Sunchales basketball players
New Orleans Privateers men's basketball players
Soles de Mexicali players
Sportspeople from Entre Ríos Province
People from Wesley Chapel, Florida
Power forwards (basketball)
Regatas Corrientes basketball players
Sportspeople from the Tampa Bay area